Rudolph Christian Schwenck (April 6, 1884 – November 27, 1941) was a pitcher in Major League Baseball who played briefly for the Chicago Cubs during the  season. He was born in Louisville, Kentucky.

In a one-season career, Schwenck posted a 1–1 record with a 13.50 earned run average in three appearances, including two starts, giving up six earned runs on 16 hits and three walks while striking out three in 14.0 innings of work.

Schwenck died in Anchorage, Kentucky, at the age of 57.

External links

Retrosheet

1884 births
1941 deaths
Chicago Cubs players
Major League Baseball pitchers
Baseball players from Louisville, Kentucky
Vicksburg Hill Billies players
Fort Worth Panthers players
Lake Charles Creoles players
Mobile Sea Gulls players
Columbia Gamecocks players
Memphis Egyptians players
Memphis Turtles players
Louisville Colonels (minor league) players
Spokane Indians players
Sacramento Sacts players
Dallas Giants players
Nashville Vols players